Claudine's Return is a movie released in 1998 starring Christina Applegate.  It was filmed almost entirely on the American island of Tybee Island, Georgia with a few shots from the surrounding areas.  It was released as Kiss of Fire on DVD.

External links
 

1998 drama films
1998 films
Films set in the United States
American drama films
Films scored by Michel Colombier
Films shot in Savannah, Georgia
Films directed by Antonio Tibaldi
1990s English-language films
1990s American films